Retroactive Records is an independent record label in Keokuk, Iowa.

The label was founded in 2002 by Matt Hunt, who had previously operated a small label called Magdalene Records. Originally intended to reissue classic Christian metal, the label has since grown to sign new artists, release original albums by those artists, and release other genres of music. They have also started and acquired several smaller labels.

Artists 

The following represents a list of bands with albums both released and re-released on Retroactive.

Imprints 

 Born Twice Records
 Bombworks Records
 GospoMusic
 Watergrave Records

See also 

 List of record labels

References

External links 

 Retroactive Records

American independent record labels
Heavy metal record labels
Rock record labels